The 2014 U.S. Open Grand Prix was the seventh grand prix gold and grand prix tournament of the 2014 BWF Grand Prix Gold and Grand Prix. The tournament was held in Orange County Badminton Club, Orange, United States December 8 until December 13, 2014 and had a total purse of $50,000.

Players by nation

Men's singles

Seeds

  Hsu Jen-hao (champion)
  Misha Zilberman (semi-final)
  Howard Shu (second round)
  Zulfadli Zulkiffli (quarter-final)
  Kevin Cordon (second round)
  Daniel Paiola (second round)
  Sattawat Pongnairat (second round)
  Petr Koukal (final)

Finals

Top half

Section 1

Section 2

Section 3

Section 4

Bottom half

Section 5

Section 6

Section 7

Section 8

Women's singles

Seeds

  Zhang Beiwen (champion)
  Iris Wang (second round)
  Jamie Subandhi (second round)
  Fabiana Silva (second round)

Finals

Top half

Section 1

Section 2

Bottom half

Section 3

Section 4

Men's doubles

Seeds

  Adam Cwalina / Przemysław Wacha (champion)
  Phillip Chew / Sattawat Pongnairat (semi-final)
  Max Schwenger / Josche Zurwonne (second round)
  Solis Jonathan / Rodolfo Ramirez (second round)

Finals

Top half

Section 1

Section 2

Bottom half

Section 3

Section 4

Women's doubles

Seeds

  Eva Lee / Paula Lynn Obanana (final)
  Johanna Goliszewski / Carla Nelte (quarter-final)

Finals

Top half

Bottom half

Mixed doubles

Seeds

  Max Schwenger / Carla Nelte (semi-final)
  Phillip Chew / Jamie Subandhi (second round)
  Peter Kaesbauer / Isabel Herttrich (champion)
  Mario Cuba / Katherine Winder (quarter-final)

Finals

Top half

Section 1

Section 2

Bottom half

Section 3

Section 4

References
tournamentsoftware.com

U.S. Open Grand Prix
BWF Grand Prix Gold and Grand Prix